Peroxynitrite (sometimes called peroxonitrite) is an ion with the formula ONOO−.  It is a structural isomer of nitrate,

Preparation
Peroxynitrite can be prepared by the reaction of superoxide with nitric oxide:

It is prepared by the reaction of hydrogen peroxide with nitrite:
 H2O2  +   →  ONOO−  +  H2O
Its presence is indicated by the absorbance at 302 nm (pH 12, ε302 = 1670 M−1 cm−1).

Reactions
Peroxynitrite is weakly basic with a pKa of ~6.8.

It is reactive toward DNA and proteins.  

ONOO− reacts nucleophilically with carbon dioxide.  In vivo, the concentration of carbon dioxide is about 1 mM, and its reaction with ONOO− occurs quickly.  Thus, under physiological conditions, the reaction of ONOO− with carbon dioxide to form nitrosoperoxycarbonate is by far the predominant pathway for ONOO−.  homolyzes to form carbonate radical and nitrogen dioxide, again as a pair of caged radicals.  Approximately 66% of the time, these two radicals recombine to form carbon dioxide and nitrate.  The other 33% of the time, these two radicals escape the solvent cage and become free radicals.  It is these radicals (carbonate radical and nitrogen dioxide) that are believed to cause peroxynitrite-related cellular damage.

Peroxynitrous acid

Its conjugate acid peroxynitrous acid is highly reactive, although peroxynitrite is stable in basic solutions.

See also
Nitrotyrosine
Reactive nitrogen species

References

Oxyanions
Atmospheric chemistry
Toxins